Pendleton is a city and the county seat of Umatilla County, Oregon. The population was 17,107 at the time of the 2020 census, which includes approximately 1,600 people who are incarcerated at Eastern Oregon Correctional Institution.

Pendleton is the smaller of the two principal cities of the Hermiston–Pendleton Micropolitan Statistical Area. This micropolitan area covers Morrow and Umatilla counties and had a combined population of 92,261 at the 2020 census.

History 
A European-American commercial center began to develop here in 1851, when Dr. William C. McKay established a trading post at the mouth of McKay Creek. A United States Post Office named Marshall (for the owner, and sometime gambler, of another local store) was established April 21, 1865, and later renamed Pendleton, after politician and diplomat George H. Pendleton (1825–1889), who served as a U.S. Representative and Senator from Ohio. The city was incorporated by the Oregon Legislative Assembly on October 25, 1880.

By 1900, Pendleton had a population of 4,406 and was the fourth-largest city in Oregon. The Pendleton Woolen Mills and Pendleton Round Up became features of the city captured in early paintings by Walter S. Bowman. Like many cities in Eastern Oregon, where thousands of Chinese immigrant workers built the transcontinental railroad, it had a flourishing Chinatown that developed as the workers settled here. The sector is supposed to have been underlain by a network of tunnels, which are now a tourist attraction. The authenticity as a Chinese tunnel system has been questioned.

The town is the cultural center of Eastern Oregon. Pendleton's "Old town" is listed as a Historic District on the National Register of Historic Places.

The Confederated Tribes of the Umatilla Indian Reservation (CTUIR) have their property nearby. They have established the Wildhorse Resort & Casino and golf course on the reservation to generate revenue for development and welfare. They have also built the Tamástslikt Cultural Institute, for education and interpretation of their cultures.

Economy

Pendleton Woolen Mills is a maker of wool blankets, shirts, and an assortment of other woolen goods. Founded in 1909 by Clarence, Roy and Chauncey Bishop, the company built upon earlier businesses related to the many sheep ranches in the region. A wool-scouring plant opened in Pendleton in 1893 to wash raw wool for shipping. In 1895, the scouring mill was converted into a mill that made wool blankets and robes for Native Americans. Both businesses failed to survive, but the Bishops, with the help of a local bond issue, enlarged the mill and improved its efficiency. They developed a successful line of garments and blankets with "vivid colors and intricate patterns."

St. Anthony Hospital in Pendleton is a 25-bed medical center.

Eastern Oregon Correctional Institution (EOCI) in Pendleton is the only place in Oregon where inmates make "Prison Blues" denim clothing. The prison also operates a commercial laundry serving customers that include EOCI, the Snake River Correctional Institution, Pendleton High School, a local flour mill, and other entities. In addition, some EOCI inmates work as clerks or have jobs in food service or maintenance.

Geography and climate

The city was built on both sides of the Umatilla River, which has periodically flooded and caused some damage. In the beginning, the river was vital as a transportation and trading route for settlers, as well as a water and power source. It connected the city to the Columbia River.

Pendleton has a semi-arid climate (Köppen BSk) with short, cool winters and hot summers.

Demographics

As of 2000 the median income for a household in the city was $36,800, and the median income for a family was $47,410. Males had a median income of $31,763 versus $23,858 for females. The per capita income for the city was $17,551. About 8.7% of families and 13.3% of the population were below the poverty line, including 16.4% of those under age 18 and 8.1% of those age 65 or over.

2010 census
As of the census of 2010, there were 16,612 people, 6,220 households, and 3,789 families residing in the city. The racial makeup of the city was 87.3% White, 1.4% African American, 3.2% Native American, 1.1% Asian, 0.2% Pacific Islander, 3.6% from other races, and 3.3% from two or more races. Hispanic or Latino of any race were 9.7% of the population.

There were 6,220 households, of which 30.5% had children under the age of 18 living with them, 42.9% were married couples living together, 12.6% had a female householder with no husband present, 5.5% had a male householder with no wife present, and 39.1% were non-families. 31.3% of all households were made up of individuals, and 11.1% had someone living alone who was 65 years of age or older. The average household size was 2.37 and the average family size was 2.96.

The median age in the city was 36.9 years. 21.9% of residents were under the age of 18; 11.1% were between the ages of 18 and 24; 28% were from 25 to 44; 26.3% were from 45 to 64; and 12.8% were 65 years of age or older. The gender makeup of the city was 53.4% male and 46.6% female.

Arts and culture

Annual events
In addition to the woolen mills, Pendleton is also famous for its annual rodeo, the Pendleton Round-Up. First held in 1910, it is part of the Professional Rodeo Cowboys Association (PRCA)-sanctioned rodeo circuit. It is among the top ten PRCA venues in terms of prize money.

Pendleton is also home to the annual Pendleton Whiskey Music Festival .  This annual event is held in the historic Pendleton Round-up Arena in July.  Past performers have included Maroon 5, Toby Keith, Zac Brown Band, Pitbull, Blake Shelton, and Post Malone.

The Festival of Trees is held in early December each year. It is a fundraising event produced by the St. Anthony Hospital Foundation.

Museums and other points of interest

Local arts institutions include the Pendleton Center for the Arts (in the town's old Carnegie Library building) and Crow's Shadow Institute of the Arts on the nearby Umatilla Indian Reservation.

The Heritage Station Museum operated by the Umatilla County Historical Society is located in the historic 1909 Pendleton Train Depot. The museum offers two galleries covering regional and local history as well as a one-room schoolhouse, family cabin, caboose, barn, and signal house.

The Pendleton Farmers' Market operates on Friday evenings from May through October on South Main Street.
Pendleton Underground Tours which features the history of Pendleton and a tour through the tunnels and the brothels. It is open year-round.

Sports and recreation
The city hosts the annual Oregon School Activities Association 2A basketball tournament at the Pendleton Convention Center. Eight teams of boys and eight of girls compete for their respective championships during a four-day tournament. Civic leaders regard the influx of family and other fans the second-most important boost to the local economy, behind the Round-Up. Total attendance at the tournament in 2010 exceeded 13,000.

The Pendleton Aquatic Center, managed by Pendleton Parks & Recreation, features two tower water slides as well tubes and smaller slides, three pools, a diving well, and picnic areas. The aquatic center is adjacent to the high school.

Transportation
Highways serving Pendleton include Interstate 84 and U.S. Route 30 running east–west and U.S. Route 395 running north–south. The city is also served by Oregon Route 37 and Oregon Route 11.

Pendleton lies along the Union Pacific Railroad (UP), constructed originally through the area in the 1880s by the Oregon Railway and Navigation Company (OR&N). In 1880, the OR&N began construction of a rail line from Portland through the Columbia Gorge to eastern Oregon. It reached Umatilla and Wallula in 1881, Pendleton in 1882, and then La Grande, Baker City, and Huntington, where by 1884 it met the UP line from Utah. Since Pendleton was also connected by rail to the Northern Pacific line at Wallula and Walla Walla, by 1885 it was a stop on two transcontinental lines. The UP absorbed the OR&N line in 1889.

Between 1977 and 1997, the city was a regular stop along the former route of Amtrak's Pioneer between Chicago and Seattle via Salt Lake City and Portland.

Regional public aviation service is through Eastern Oregon Regional Airport,  outside Pendleton. The airport is owned by the City of Pendleton. Boutique Air offers daily flights between Pendleton and Portland, which began in 2016.

Media
Two newspapers are published in Pendleton. The East Oregonian is a daily with a circulation of about 6,800. The Pendleton Record is a weekly with a circulation of about 900.

KFFX-TV (Fox 11), a television station based in Pendleton, serves a market that also includes the Washington cities of Yakima, Pasco, Richland, and Kennewick. Oregon radio stations based in or near Pendleton include: KTIX AM 1240, sports; KUMA AM 1290, news and talk; KRBM FM 90.9, Oregon Public Broadcasting, news and talk; KLKY FM 96.1, based in Stanfield and broadcasting by translator K237DS in Pendleton at FM 95.3, classic rock; KNHK-FM 101.9, based in Weston and broadcasting by translator K262CJ in Pendleton at 100.3 FM, top 40; KWHT FM 103.5, country; and KWVN-FM 107.7, variety.

Notable people

Tracy Baker – Major League Baseball player; born in Pendleton
Walter S. Bowman, professional photographer; based in Pendleton from the late 1880s to mid-1930s
John Bunnell – hosted World's Wildest Police Videos; born in Pendleton
Dave Cockrum – comic book artist; born in Pendleton
Dave Kingman – Major League Baseball player, three-time All-Star; born in Pendleton
Michael J. Kopetski – former representative for Oregon's 5th congressional district; born in Pendleton
James Lavadour – painter; lifelong resident of Umatilla Reservation
Bob Lilly – Pro Football Hall of Fame defensive tackle; graduated from Pendleton High School in 1957
Donald McKay – scout and leader of the Warm Springs Indians during the Modoc War
William Cameron McKay, Oregon pioneer physician, scout 
Elaine Miles – actress who played Marilyn Whirlwind on Northern Exposure; early childhood on Umatilla Reservation
Frances Moore Lappé – author and activist; born in Pendleton
Lee Moorhouse - Indian agent in Pendleton and amateur photographer 
Roy Schuening – football player, Oregon State and NFL; born in Pendleton  
Gordon Smith – 1997–2009 U.S. Senator (R) from Oregon, born in Pendleton
Milan Smith – judge on United States Court of Appeals for the Ninth Circuit; born in Pendleton
Kenneth Snelson – sculptor and photographer; childhood in Pendleton
Dan Straily – Major League Baseball player; grew up in Pendleton
Archie R. Twitchell - test pilot and actor 
Quade Winter, opera singer

Sister city
Pendleton has a sister city relationship with Minamisōma, in Fukushima Prefecture, Japan. Since then, Japanese exchange students from Minamisoma have continued to visit Pendleton, though students from Pendleton have stopped visiting Minamisoma over growing radiation concerns.

See also
McKay, Oregon
McKay Creek National Wildlife Refuge
McKay Reservoir

References

External links

Pendleton listing in the Oregon Blue Book

Pendleton Chamber of Commerce

 
1851 establishments in Oregon Territory
Cities in Oregon
Cities in Umatilla County, Oregon
County seats in Oregon
Pendleton–Hermiston Micropolitan Statistical Area
Populated places established in 1851